Leona Rachel Glidden Running (August 24, 1916 – January 22, 2014) was the first Seventh-day Adventist woman to earn a Doctor of Philosophy (Ph.D.) in Ancient Near Eastern Studies at Johns Hopkins University.  She was also the first female to join the faculty of the Seventh-day Adventist Theological Seminary in 1955 at Takoma Park, Maryland and later when the Seminary relocated to the campus of Andrews University.

Early life and education 
Running was born on August 24, 1916, in Flint, Michigan.  Her father was Charles Comstock Glidden and her mother was Leona Mary Bertha Boat Glidden.  From an early age, Running was attracted to learning languages and was encouraged by her mother, who was a teacher.  She completed her schooling at Adelphian Academy in Holly, Michigan.

Running undertook a bachelor of arts in modern languages (French, German, and English) from Emmanuel Missionary College and graduated as valedictorian in 1937.  She also completed a master of arts in Greek and Hebrew (the two primary biblical languages) from the Adventist Theological Seminary in 1955. She completed a Ph.D. in Semitic languages from Johns Hopkins University in 1964.  In May 2012, Running received an honorary Doctor of Humane Letters from Andrews University.

Career
The Seventh-day Adventist church does not ordain female clergy and Running began her academic career at a time when few women were accepted in a professional capacity within the Seventh-day Adventist church.  Seminary leadership were also skeptical regarding their male students willingness to be taught by a female academic, and of Running's ability to relate to male students.  She was initially hired on a probationary basis, but within a year was given faculty status and not long after, full tenure.

During her tenure at the Seventh-day Adventist Theological Seminary (1955-2002) she taught Greek, Hebrew, Egyptian, Akkadian, Syriac, and Aramaic.  She was also the first female president of the Chicago Society of Biblical Research from 1981 to 1982.

Running also created "The Leona Glidden Running Collection: Women in Church and Society" which is a collection of published opinions and thought regarding women in the church and in society.  The extensive collection contains files regarding current issues of women, including the ordination of women ministers in various denominations, women in athletic and other careers, the influence of economic conditions on women, aging, assault and abuse, rape, health, gender roles, and marriage.

Personal life
She married Leif Running on May 17, 1942, however, he died August 20, 1946 while undergoing surgery. Running was almost 30 at the time of his death and he was aged 37.  Running died, aged 97, on January 22, 2014, in Berrien Springs, Michigan.

See also 

 Seventh-day Adventist Church
 Seventh-day Adventist theology
 History of the Seventh-day Adventist Church
 Seventh-day Adventist Church Pioneers
 Seventh-day Adventist worship

References

External links 
 Leona Glidden Running:Dialogue with an Adventist linguist and scholar College and University Dialogue Retrieved April 8, 2019

American Christian theologians
Seventh-day Adventist theologians
People from Flint, Michigan
American Seventh-day Adventists
Andrews University faculty
Old Testament scholars
1916 births
2014 deaths
Female biblical scholars
Seventh-day Adventist biblical scholars